Kim Do-yeon is a Korean name consisting of the family name Kim and the given name Do-yeon, and may also refer to:

 Kim Do-yeon (politician) (1894–1967), Korean politician
 Kim Do-yeon (footballer) (born 1988), South Korean footballer
 Kim Do-yeon (singer) (born 1999), South Korean singer